The Men's 10,000 m speed skating competition at the 2006 Winter Olympics in Turin, Italy, was held on 24 February.

Records
Prior to this competition, the existing world and Olympic records were as follows.

No new world or Olympic records were set during this competition.

Results

References

External links
 

Men's speed skating at the 2006 Winter Olympics